Oglethorpe may refer to:

People
Oglethorpe (surname)
Places
 Bramham cum Oglethorpe, West Yorkshire, England
 Brookhaven/Oglethorpe (MARTA station), a passenger rail station located in the Brookhaven neighborhood of Atlanta, Georgia
 Mount Oglethorpe, Georgia
 Oglethorpe County, Georgia
 Oglethorpe, Georgia
 Oglethorpe University, Atlanta, Georgia
 Oglethorpe Charter School in Savannah, Georgia
 Oglethorpe Mall, a shopping mall in Savannah, Georgia
 Military
 Camp Oglethorpe, a prisoner of war camp near Macon, Georgia, maintained by the Confederates during the American Civil War
 Oglethorpe Barracks, 19th century Army post, Savannah, Georgia
 Fort Oglethorpe, Georgia, the town
 Fort Oglethorpe (Fort Oglethorpe, Georgia), Army base founded in 1904
 Fort Oglethorpe, GA (Prisoner-of-war-Camp), a POW camp during World War I
 Fort James Jackson, fort built during 1808-1812 that protected Savannah, Georgia and was also known as Fort Oglethorpe

Other Uses
 Quercus oglethorpensis, also called Oglethorpe Oak, a species of plant found in the Piedmont of Georgia and South Carolina, and in Louisiana and Mississippi
 USS Oglethorpe (AKA-100), an Andromeda-class attack cargo ship in service from 1945 to 1968
See List of NASCAR race tracks for Oglethorpe Speedway Park, a NASCAR race track in Pooler, Georgia
 Oglethorpe Power, an electric power company headquartered in Tucker, Georgia
 Change at Oglethorpe, a radio program that aired on BBC Radio 2
 Oglethorpe, a recurring character from Aqua Teen Hunger Force
 Bo Buchanan, Beaufort Oglethorpe "Bo" Buchanan, a fictional character on the soap opera One Life to Live